Orion's Belt or the Belt of Orion, also known as the Three Kings or Three Sisters, is an asterism in the constellation Orion. It consists of the three bright stars Alnitak, Alnilam and Mintaka.

Looking for Orion's Belt is the easiest way to locate Orion in the night sky. The stars are more or less evenly spaced in a nearly straight line, and so can be visualized as the belt of the eponymous hunter's clothing. They are best viewed in the early night sky during the Northern Winter/Southern Summer, in particular, the month of January at around 9:00 pm.

Component stars

Alnitak

Alnitak (ζ Orionis) is a triple star system at the eastern end of Orion's belt and is 1,260 light-years from the Earth. Alnitak B is a 4th-magnitude B-type star which orbits Alnitak A every 1,500 years. The primary (Alnitak A) is itself a close binary, comprising Alnitak Aa (a blue supergiant of spectral type O9.7 Ibe and an apparent magnitude of 2.0) and Alnitak Ab (a blue subgiant of spectral type B1IV and an apparent magnitude of about 4). Alnitak Aa is estimated to be up to 28 times as massive as the Sun and have a diameter 20 times greater. It is the brightest star of class O in the night sky.

Alnilam

Alnilam (ε Orionis) is a supergiant, approximately 2,000 light-years away from Earth and magnitude 1.70. It is the 29th-brightest star in the sky and the fourth-brightest in Orion. It is 375,000 times more luminous than the Sun. Its spectrum serves as one of the stable anchor points by which other stars are classified.

Mintaka
  
Mintaka (δ Orionis) is 1,200 light-years away and shines with magnitude 2.21. Mintaka is 90,000 times more luminous than the Sun. Mintaka is a binary star. The two stars orbit around each other every 5.73 days.

References in history and culture

Richard Hinckley Allen lists many folk names for the Belt of Orion. English ones include: Jacob's Rod or Jacob's Staff; Peter's Staff; the Golden Yard-arm; The L, or Ell; The Ell and Yard; the Yard-stick, and the Yard-wand; the Ellwand; Our Lady's Wand; the Magi / the Three Kings; the Three Marys; or simply the Three Stars.

The passage "Canst thou bind the sweet influences of Pleiades, or loose the bands of Orion?" is found in the Bible's Book of Job and Book of Amos. Tennyson's poem The Princess describes Orion's belt as:

In China's Classic of Poetry, the asterism, under the name "Shen" (参), was paired with Antares, which is known as "Shang" (商), to be a metaphor for two people who could never unite. This might have stemmed from the observation that both Orion's Belt and Antares rise in the east and set in the west, but Antares only rises once Orion's Belt has set and vice versa. 

The three stars of the belt are known in Portugal, South America, and the Philippines as Las Tres Marías in Spanish, and as "As Três Marias" in Portuguese.They also mark the northern night sky when the Sun is at its lowest point, and were a clear marker for ancient timekeeping. In Mexico they are called the Los Tres Reyes Magos.

In Finnish mythology, the Belt of Orion is called Väinämöisen vyö (Väinämöinen's Belt). The stars which appear to "hang" off the belt form an asterism called Kalevanmiekka (Kaleva's sword).  In pre-Christian Scandinavia, the belt was known as Frigg's Distaff (Friggerock) or Freyja's distaff. Similarly Jacob's Staff and Peter's Staff were European biblical derived terms, as were the Three Magi, or the Three Kings. Väinämöinen's Scythe (Kalevala) and Kalevan Sword are terms from Finnish mythology.

The Seri people of northwestern Mexico call the three belt stars Hapj (a name denoting a hunter) which consists of three stars:  Hap (mule deer), Haamoja (pronghorn), and Mojet (bighorn sheep). Hap is in the middle and has been shot by the hunter; its blood has dripped onto Tiburón Island.

The Māori people of New Zealand refer to the belt as Tautoru (literally "string of three"), and it is often seen as the stern of the constellation Te Waka o Rangi (the canoe of Rangi), which extends to its prow at Matariki (The Pleiades). The rising of Matariki in the dawn sky marks  the Māori New Year in late May or early June.

Gallery

See also

Thornborough Henges, ancient monument in North Yorkshire
Orion correlation theory, fringe theory relating the Giza pyramids to the stars of Orion's Belt

References

Orion (constellation)
Asterisms (astronomy)
Open clusters
Stellar associations